The Juruá River (Portuguese Rio Juruá; Spanish Río Yuruá) is a southern affluent river of the Amazon River west of the Purus River, sharing with this the bottom of the immense inland Amazon depression, and having all the characteristics of the Purus as regards curvature, sluggishness and general features of the low, half-flooded forest country it traverses.

For most of its length the river flows through the Purus várzea ecoregion.
This is surrounded by the Juruá-Purus moist forests ecoregion.

The  Médio Juruá Extractive Reserve, created in 1997, is on the left bank of the river as it meanders in a generally northeast direction through the municipality of Carauari.
The lower Juruá River forms the western boundary of the  Baixo Juruá Extractive Reserve, created in 2001. Since 2018 the lower portion of the river in Brazil has been designated as a protected Ramsar site.

References

Tributaries of the Amazon River
Rivers of Amazonas (Brazilian state)
Rivers of Peru
Rivers of Ucayali Region
International rivers of South America
Ramsar sites in Brazil